Temein may refer to:
the Temein people
the Temein language